Alphonse Legros (8 May 1837 – 8 December 1911) was a French, later British, painter, etcher, sculptor, and medallist.  He moved to London in 1863 and later took British citizenship.  He was important as a teacher in the British etching revival.

Life
Legros was born in Dijon; his father was an accountant, and came from the neighbouring village of Véronnes. While young, Legros visited the farms of his relatives, and the peasants and landscapes of that part of France are the subjects of many of his works. He was sent to the art school at Dijon with a view to qualifying for a trade, and was apprenticed to Maître Nicolardo, house decorator and painter of images. In 1851, Legros left for Paris to take another situation; but passing through Lyon he worked for six months as journeyman wall-painter under the decorator Beuchot, who was painting the chapel of Cardinal Bonald in the cathedral.

In Paris, Legros studied with Charles-Antoine Cambon, scene-painter and decorator of theatres. He also attended the drawing-school of Lecoq de Boisbaudran (the "Petite école") where he found himself in sympathy with Jules Dalou and Auguste Rodin. In 1855, he attended the evening classes of the École des Beaux Arts. Legros learned the art of etching around 1857, and taught himself the making of medals.

Legros sent two portraits to the Paris Salon of 1857: one was rejected, and formed part of the exhibition of protest organized by François Bonvin in his studio; the other, which was accepted, was a profile portrait of his father. This work was presented to the museum at Tours by the artist when his friend Jean-Charles Cazin was curator. Champfleury saw the work in the Salon, and sought out the artist to enlist him in the "Realists," a group round Gustave Courbet.

In 1859, Legros's L'Angelus was exhibited, the first of the church interiors for which he was best known. Two years later Ex Voto (1861; Musée des Beaux-Arts de Dijon) was exhibited, but only obtained a mention at the Salon. He moved to England in 1863 and in 1864 married Frances Rosetta Hodgson. At first he lived by his etching and teaching. He then became teacher of etching at the South Kensington School of Art, and in 1876 Slade Professor at University College London in succession to Edward Poynter.

Whilst teaching at the Slade School Legros taught a large contingent of women, who came to be known as the Slade Girls. Through his field of sculpture he encouraged the design of medals based upon the Italian renaissance style of portrait, illustrating the character, profession or life of the individual portrayed.

The Slade Girls attracted commissions from a range of societies and organisations due to the beauty and skill of their work. Pupils of note include the Casella sisters (Ella and Nelia), Jessie Mothersole, Fedora Gleichen, Lilian Swainson (later Hamilton) and Elinor Hallé.

In his Etchings by French and English Artists (1874) Philip Gilbert Hamerton included work by Legros and Léon Gaucherel.

Legros was naturalized as a British citizen in 1881, and remained at University College for 17 years. He would draw or paint a torso or a head for the students in an hour or less; in the painting school he insisted on a good outline, preserved by a thin rub in of umber, and then the work was to be finished in a single painting. He considered the traditional journey to Italy an important part of artistic training, and gave part of his salary to augment the income available for a travelling studentship.

Legros died on 8 December 1911 in Watford.

Works
Later works, after Legros resigned his professorship in 1892, returned to the manner of his early days—imaginative landscapes, castles in Spain, and farms in Burgundy, etchings such the series of The Triumph of Death, and the sculptured fountains for the gardens of the Duke of Portland at Welbeck Abbey. Pictures, drawings and etchings by Legros, went to the following galleries and museums:

"Amende Honorable", "Dead Christ", bronzes, medals and twenty-two drawings, in the Luxembourg, Paris
"Landscape," "Study of a Head," and portraits of Browning, Burne-Jones, Cassel, Huxley and Marshall, at the Victoria and Albert Museum, Kensington
"Femmes en prière" (Tate, London)
"The Tinker" and six other works from the lonides Collection, bequeathed to South Kensington
"Christening", "Barricade", "The Poor at Meat", two portraits and several drawings and etchings, collection of Lord Carlisle
"Two Priests at the Organ", "Landscape" and etchings, collection of Rev. Stopford Brooke
"Head of a Priest", collection of Mr Vereker Hamilton
"The Weed-burner", some sculpture and a large collection of etchings and drawings, Mr Guy Knowles
"Psyche," collection of Mr L W Hudson
"Snow Scene," collection of George Frederic Watts RA
Thirty-five drawings and etchings, the Print Room, British Museum
"Jacob's Dream" and twelve drawings of the antique, Cambridge
"St Jerome", two studies of heads and some drawings, Manchester
"The Pilgrimage" and "Study made before the Class" (Walker Art Gallery, Liverpool)
"Study of Heads," Peel Pan Museum, Salford.
"Portrait of Cardinal With Patron Saint" (oil painting), Snite Museum of Art, Notre Dame University

"Communion" (around 1876)

References

Attribution

Further reading

 Dr Hans W Singer, "Alphonse Legros," Die graphischen Künste (1898);
 Léonce Bénédite, "Alphonse Legros," Revue d'an (Paris, 1900); 
 Cosmo Monkhouse, 'Professor Legros', Magazine of Art (1882).
 Edward Twohig R.E., Print REbels: Haden - Palmer - Whistler and the origins of the RE (Royal Society of Painter-Printmakers) . Published by the Royal Society of Painter-Printmakers in London, in 2018.

External links

The Boston Public Library's Alphonse Legros set on Flickr.com
Alphonse Legros exhibition catalogs
 

1837 births
1911 deaths
French etchers
19th-century English painters
English male painters
20th-century English painters
20th-century British sculptors
19th-century British sculptors
19th-century French painters
French male painters
19th-century French sculptors
French male sculptors
French medallists
English etchers
English male sculptors
British medallists
Artists from Dijon
Academics of the Slade School of Fine Art
20th-century British printmakers
19th-century French male artists
20th-century English male artists
19th-century English male artists